Stonebarrow Hill is a hill, east of Charmouth, near the Dorset coast in southern England. Stonebarrow and the surrounding area is notable for its landslides. The hill is often a starting point for walks around the Golden Cap estate.

There is a National Trust Centre at Stonebarrow Hill and also a permanent orienteering course established by Wimborne Orienteers in conjunction with the Trust.

See also 
 List of hills of Dorset

References

External links
 Landslide at Stonebarrow Hill, Dorset British Geological Survey

Hills of Dorset